Aap Ke Saath is a 1986 Hindi-language film produced and directed by J. Om Prakash, starring Anil Kapoor, Vinod Mehra, Smita Patil, Rati Agnihotri, Utpal Dutt, And Amrish Puri

Plot
Ashok and Vimal are two grandsons of K.K. Vimal, who is a womanizer. Ashok and Ganga are in love, but when Ashok was about to propose to Ganga for marriage, he finds that Ganga has complained against him in the police station for sexual molestation. Ashok pays some money to Ganga and hopes never to see her. K. K. brings home a girl named Deepa as K. K. wants Deepa and Ashok to marry. But Deepa falls in love with Vimal. Vimal frequently visits a courtesan. When Ashok goes to the courtesan to bring home Vimal, Ashok finds that the courtesan is none other than Ganga.

Cast

Anil Kapoor as Vimal
Vinod Mehra as Ashok
Smita Patil as Ganga
Rati Agnihotri as Deepa/Salma
Utpal Dutt as K. K. Sahib
Aruna Irani as Kamla
Amrish Puri as Persha
Pinchoo Kapoor as Kishorilal Malhotra (old aged Home)
Gajanan Jagirdar as Parsaji (Old Aged Home)
Shivraj as Ojha (Old Aged Home)
Raj Mehra as Doctor (Guest Role)
Sunder (actor)  as Pareshan Singh, Servant
Yunus Parvez   as Mr Dhingra, General Manager in Ashok Office
Pradeep Rawat (actor) as Rajwa, henchman of Persha (uncredited)

Soundtrack
Mohammed Aziz dubbed Shabbir Kumar 's song "Bahke Bahke Ye Jazbaat" 
Lata Mangeshkar dubbed Anuradha Paudwal's song "Jind Le Gaya".

References

External links 
 

1986 films
1980s Hindi-language films
Films scored by Laxmikant–Pyarelal
Films directed by J. Om Prakash